Meopta - optika, s.r.o. is a Czech Republic based company that manufactures various products mainly in the field of optics. The company was once well-known for its still and movie cameras, although it no longer manufactures such products.

History
Optikotechna company was founded in 1933 in Přerov, Czechoslovakia. Originally established with the intention of producing a limited range of lenses and condensers, the company rapidly expanded the range of products to include enlargers, composite lenses, binoculars, riflescopes, cameras and slide projectors.

After 1935, Meopta optika became a subsidiary of Zbrojovka Brno and a major supplier of military optics for the Czechoslovak Army. Company retained its focus on military production when it was seized by Germans during the occupation of Czechoslovakia as well as after WW2, when it was nationalized and renamed to Meopta – an acronym for MEchanická OPTická výrobA ("mechanical optical manufacturing"). In 1945 the company merged with Bratislava subsidiary of C. P. Goerz. Apart from military deliveries, the company became one of the world's major manufacturers of cinema projectors between 1947 and 1970. The abrupt halt of military demand after the dissolution of Warsaw pact forced the company to refocus mainly on civilian applications.

The company was privatized in 1992. The majority owners became the members of the Rausnitz family who emigrated from Czechoslovakia to the United States in 1946. During WWII the Rausnitz brothers had been active soldiers of the 1st Czechoslovak Army Corps and were decorated for their service.

Meopta U.S.A., Inc. was founded by the same Czech-American family in New York in 1960 under the name Tyrolit Company, Inc. At that time, its main business was selling grinding wheels in US and Canada. Tyrolit gradually changed its focus to manufacturing various optical products and in 2005 was renamed to Meopta U.S.A., Inc.

In December 2009, the Ministry of Industry and Trade issued a decision to provide a subsidy from the OPEI for the Modernization of Meopta Research and Development project, so that the following year the development building could be reconstructed and research and development capacities were significantly expanded.

In 2013, the company had 2,200 employees in Přerov and 150 in the USA.

Meopta owner Paul Rausnitz received the Medal of Merit for the State in the field of business from the hands of the President of the Republic Miloš Zeman on October 28.

Cameras

TLR 6x6
 Flexette
 Autoflex
 Optiflex
 Flexaret II
 Flexaret III
 Flexaret IV
 Flexaret V
 Flexaret Standart
 Flexaret automat VI
 Flexaret automat VII

Folding 6x6
 Milona

Interchangeable lens (viewfinder/rangefinder) 35mm
 Opema I/II

Fixed lens 35mm
 Optineta
 Etareta

Stereo 35mm
 Stereo 35

16mm Subminiature
 Mikroma 
 Mikroma II
 Mikroma Police
 Mikroma II snake skin

Large format 13x18
 Magnola

Movie cameras

8 mm Cameras
 OP 8 (1939)
 Sonet 8 (1956)
 Admira 8 D (1946–47)
 Admira 8 IIa (1954)
 Admira 8 F (1960–64)
 Admira EL 8 (1960) - one and only camera having the Zoom lens
 Admira 8 G1 (1966–68)
 Admira 8 G2 (1966)
 Admira 8 G0 (1968–73)
 Admira 8 G1 Supra (1968–71)
 Admira 8 G2 Supra (1968–71)
 Admira 8 L1 Supra (1971)
 Admira 8 L2 Supra (1971)
Supra is an indication for Super 8.

9.5 mm Cameras
 Admira Ledvinka (Pocket) (1934)

16 mm Cameras
 Admira 16 (1937)
 Admira 16 A1 el. (1963–68)

Movie projectors

8 mm and 9.5 mm Projectors

 Scolar (1934)
 Sonet 8 (1938)
 OP 8 (1936)
 Optilux (1945–50)
 Jubilar 9.5 (1945–50)
 Atom (1940–45)
 Meo 8 (1954–60)
 AM 8 (1960–69)
 Meocord (1966–67)
 AM 8 Super (1967–70)
 Meolux I (1969)
 Meolux II (1972–77)
 Meos (1978)
 Meos Duo (1977–86)
 KP 8-2 Super (1976–80)

16 mm Projectors
 OP16 silent and sound (1938)
 OP 16 (1951)
 Opefon (1945)
 Almo 16 (1936)
 Pictureta (1936)
 Meopton I (1945–50)
 Meopton II (1945–50)
 Meopton IIa (1966)
 Club 16 (1962–63)
 Meoclub 16 (1965)
 Meoclub 16 Automatic (1968)
 Meoclub 16 Automatic H (1970)
 Meoclub 16 Standard (1974–78)
 Meoclub 16 Electronic (1980–84)
 Meoclub 16 AS 2 (1982–84)
 Meoclub 16 Electronic 2 (1984)

35 mm Projectors
 Eta 7 (1947)
 Meopton III (1955–57)
 Meopton IV (1959) - IV S with magnetic soundhead
 UM 70/35 (1963–73)
 MEO 5X series (1978-?)

Sport optics

Meopta is producing Binoculars, Telescopic sights, Red dot sights and Monoculars on the field of sport optics and caters hunters, birdwatchers and sport shooters. In 2019 the production includes the following series of products:

Binoculars: 
 Meostar B1
 MeoRange (available only in EU, with laser rangefinder integrated)
 MeoPro HD 
 MeoSport
 Optika HD 

Rifle Scopes 
 Steyr AUG factory optics
 MeoTac
 MeoStar R2 
 Meostar R1
 MeoPro Optika 6 
 MeoPro
 ZD

Reflex sights
 MeoSight III 
 MeoRed

References

External links
 
 
 
 

Photography companies of the Czech Republic
Companies of Czechoslovakia
Lens manufacturers
Cameras
Czech brands
Manufacturing companies established in 1933
1933 establishments in Czechoslovakia